In astronomy, a variable star designation is a unique identifier given to variable stars.  It uses a variation on the Bayer designation format, with an identifying label (as described below) preceding the Latin genitive of the name of the constellation in which the star lies. See List of constellations for a list of constellations and the genitive forms of their names.  The identifying label can be one or two Latin letters or a V plus a number (e.g. V399).  Examples are R Coronae Borealis, YZ Ceti, V603 Aquilae.

Naming
The current naming system is:
Stars with existing Greek letter Bayer designations are not given new designations.
Otherwise, start with the letter R and go through Z.
Continue with RR...RZ, then use SS...SZ, TT...TZ and so on until ZZ.
Use AA...AZ, BB...BZ, CC...CZ and so on until reaching QZ, omitting J in both the first and second positions.
Abandon the Latin script after 334 combinations of letters and start naming stars with V335, V336, and so on.
The second letter is never nearer the beginning of the alphabet than the first, e.g., no star can be BA, CA, CB, DA and so on.

History

In the early 19th century few variable stars were known, so it seemed reasonable to use the letters of the Latin script. Because very few constellations contained stars with uppercase Latin-letter Bayer designation greater than Q, the letter R was chosen as a starting point so as to avoid confusion with letter spectral types or the (now rarely used) Latin-letter Bayer designations. Although Lacaille had used uppercase R to Z letters in a few cases, for example X Puppis (HR 2548), these designations were either dropped or accepted as variable star designations. The star T Puppis was accepted by Argelander as a variable star and is included in the General Catalogue of Variable Stars with that designation but is now classed as non-variable.

This variable star naming convention was developed by Friedrich W. Argelander. There is a widespread belief according to which Argelander chose the letter R for German rot or French rouge, both meaning "red", because many variable stars known at that time appear red. However, Argelander's own statement disproves this.

By 1836, even the letter S had only been used in one constellation, Serpens. With the advent of photography the number of variables piled up quickly, and variable star names soon fell into the Bayer trap of reaching the end of the alphabet while still having stars to name. After two subsequent supplementary double-lettering systems hit similar limits, numbers were finally introduced.

As with all categories of astronomical objects, names are assigned by the International Astronomical Union (IAU). The IAU delegates the task to the Sternberg Astronomical Institute and the Institute of Astronomy of the Russian Academy of Sciences in Moscow, Russia. Sternberg publishes the General Catalog of Variable Stars (GCVS), which is periodically (approximately once every two years) amended by the publication of a new "Name-List" of variable stars. For example, in December 2011 the 80th Name-List of Variable Stars, Part II, was released, containing designations for 2,161 recently discovered variable stars; these brought the total number of variable stars in the GCVS to 45,678. Among the newly designated objects were V0654 Aurigae, V1367 Centauri, and BU Coronae Borealis.

See also 
 Star catalogue
 Star designation

References

Further reading

designation
Stellar astronomy